

Bandy

 March 29 – April 5: 2020 Bandy World Championship in  Irkutsk
 February 19 – 22: 2020 Women's Bandy World Championship in  Oslo
 TBD for October: 2020 Bandy World Cup (location TBA)

Bobsleigh & Skeleton

IBSF International events and Winter Youth Olympics
 October 26 & 27, 2019: 2020 YOG Europe Qualification #1 in  Lillehammer
 Men's Youth Skeleton winner:  Lukas David Nydegger (2 times)
 Women's Youth Skeleton winner:  Josefa Schellmoser (2 times)
 Men's Youth Monobob winners:  Alexander Czudaj (#1) /  Fabian Gisler (#2)
 Women's Youth Monobob winners:  Georgeta Popescu (#1) /  Viktoria Cernanska (#2)
 November 7 – 9, 2019: 2020 YOG Europe Qualification #2 in  Schönau am Königsee
 Men's Youth Skeleton winner:  Lukas David Nydegger (2 times)
 Women's Youth Skeleton winners:  Josefa Schellmoser (#1) /  Elisabeth Schroedl (#2)
 Men's Youth Monobob winners:  Alexander Czudaj (#1) /  Fabian Gisler (#2)
 Women's Youth Monobob winners:  Georgeta Popescu (#1) /  Viktoria Cernanska (#2)
 November 20 & 21, 2019: 2020 YOG America Qualification #1 in  Lake Placid
 Skeleton #1 winners:  James McGuire (m) /  Zhao Dan (f)
 Skeleton #2 winners:  James McGuire (m) /  Zhao Dan (f)
 Youth Monobob #1 winners:  Kim Jimin (m) /  Viktória Čerňanská (f)
 Youth Monobob #2 winners:  Kim Jimin (m) /  Viktória Čerňanská (f)
 December 7 & 8, 2019: 2020 YOG America Qualification #2 in  Park City
 Youth Monobob #1 winners:  Nathan Besnard (m) /  Camila Copain (f)
 Youth Monobob #2 winners:  Nathan Besnard (m) /  Camila Copain (f)
 Skeleton winners:  Taido Nagao (2 times) (m) /  Zhao Dan (#1) /  Hallie Clarke (#2) (f)
 December 14, 2019: 2019 IBSF Para Bobsleigh European Championships in  Oberhof
 Para Bobsleigh winner:  Corie Mapp
 January 4: IBSF European Championships 2020 (Four-man bobsleigh only) in  Winterberg
 January 19 & 20: Bobsleigh & Skeleton at the 2020 Winter Youth Olympics in  St. Moritz
 January 25 – February 1: IBSF Junior European Championships 2020 (Skeleton only) in  Altenberg
 January 30 – February 1: IBSF Junior & U23 European Championships 2020 (Bobsleigh only) in  Innsbruck
 February 8 & 9: IBSF Junior & U23 World Championships 2020 in  Winterberg
 February 14 – 16: IBSF European Championships 2020 in  Sigulda
 February 21 – March 1: IBSF World Championships 2020 in  Altenberg
 March 24 & 25: 2020 IBSF Para Bobsleigh World Championship in  Lillehammer

2019–20 Bobsleigh World Cup & 2019–20 Skeleton World Cup
 December 7 & 8, 2019: B&SWC #1 in  Lake Placid #1
 Two-man winners:  (Johannes Lochner & Florian Bauer)
 Two-woman winners:  (Kaillie Humphries & Lauren Gibbs)
 Four-man winners:  (Justin Kripps, Ryan Sommer, Ben Coakwell, Cameron Stones) 
 Skeleton winners:  Axel Jungk (m) /  Jacqueline Lölling (f)
 December 14 – 15, 2019: B&SWC #2 in  Lake Placid #2
 Two-man winners:  (Francesco Friedrich & Alexander Schüller)
 Two-woman winners:  (Kaillie Humphries & Lauren Gibbs)
 Four-man winners:  (Justin Kripps, Ryan Sommer, Ben Coakwell, Cameron Stones) 
 Skeleton winners:  Aleksandr Tretyakov (m) /  Elena Nikitina (f)
 January 3 – 5: B&SWC #3 in  Winterberg
 Two-woman winners:  (Stephanie Schneider & Kira Lipperheide)
 Four-man winners (Race 1):  (Francesco Friedrich, Candy Bauer, Thorsten Margis & Alexander Schüller)
 Four-man winners (Race 2 - European Championship):  (Johannes Lochner, Florian Bauer, Christopher Weber, Christian Rasp) 
 Skeleton winners:  Yun Sung-bin (m) /  Tina Hermann (f)
 January 10 – 12: B&SWC #4 in  La Plagne
 Two-man winners:  (Francesco Friedrich & Alexander Schüller)
 Two-woman winners:  (Kaillie Humphries & Lauren Gibbs)
 Four-man winners:  (Francesco Friedrich, Candy Bauer, Thorsten Margis & Alexander Schüller)
 Skeleton winners:  Aleksandr Tretyakov (m) /  Elena Nikitina (f)
 January 17 – 19: B&SWC #5 in  Innsbruck
 January 24 – 26: B&SWC #6 in  Schönau am Königsee
 January 31 – February 2: B&SWC #7 in  St. Moritz
 February 14 – 16: B&SWC #8 (final) in  Sigulda

2019–20 IBSF Europe Cup
 November 23 & 24, 2019: IEC #1 in  Lillehammer
 2-man Bobsleigh winners:  (Maximilian Illmann & Georg Fleischhauer)
 2-woman Bobsleigh winners:  (Andreea Grecu & Ioana Gheorghe)
 4-man Bobsleigh winners:  (Rostislav Gaitiukevich, Vladislav Zharovtsev, Nikolay Kozlov, Andrey Kazantsev)
 December 5 – 7, 2019: IEC #2 in  Altenberg #1
 2-man Bobsleigh #1 winners:  (Richard Oelsner & Eric Strauß)
 2-man Bobsleigh #2 winners:  (Richard Oelsner & Henrik Bosse)
 2-woman Bobsleigh winners:  (Andreea Grecu & Katharina Wick)
 4-man Bobsleigh winners:  (Richard Oelsner, Henrik Bosse, Eric Strauß, Florian Paul Kunze) 
 December 8, 2019: IEC #3 in  Winterberg #1
 Skeleton winners:  Lukas David Nydegger (m) /  Hannah Stevenson (f)
 December 14 & 15, 2019: IEC #4 in  Schönau am Königsee #1
 Skeleton winners:  Felix Seibel (m) /  Amelia Coltman (f)
 December 14 & 15, 2019: IEC #5 in  Winterberg #2
 2-man Bobsleigh winners:  (Richard Oelsner & Henrik Bosse)
 2-woman Bobsleigh #1 winners:  (Laura Nolte & Deborah Levi)
 2-woman Bobsleigh #2 winners:  (Anna Köhler & Tamara Seer)
 4-man Bobsleigh #1 winners:  (Jonas Jannusch, Marcel Kornhardt, Tim Gessenhardt, Bastian Heber)
 4-man Bobsleigh #2 winners:  (Bennet Buchmüller, Sebastian Mrowca, Niklas Scherer, Max Pietza)
 December 20 – 22, 2019: IEC #6 in  Schönau am Königsee #2
 2-man Bobsleigh winners:  (Oskars Melbārdis & Intars Dambis)
 2-woman Bobsleigh winners:  (Andreea Grecu & Ioana Gheorghe)
 4-man Bobsleigh #1 winners:  (Jonas Jannusch, Marcel Kornhardt, Tim Gessenhardt, Bastian Heber)
 4-man Bobsleigh #2 winners:  (Jonas Jannusch, Max Neumann, Tim Gessenhardt, Bastian Heber)
 January 10 & 11: IEC #7 in  Innsbruck #1
 January 18 & 19: IEC #8 in  Sigulda
 January 24 & 25: IEC #9 in  Altenberg #2
 January 30 – February 1: IEC #10 (final) in  Innsbruck #2

2019–20 IBSF North American Cup
 November 18–21, 2019 NAC #1 in  Lake Placid
 2-man Bobsleigh #1 winners:  (Codie Bascue & Josh Williamson)
 2-man Bobsleigh #2 winners:  (Justin Kripps & Cameron Stones)
 2-woman Bobsleigh #1 winners:  (Christine de Bruin, Kristen Bujnowski, Janine McCue)
 2-woman Bobsleigh #2 winners:  (Kaillie Humphries & Sylvia Hoffmann)
 4-man Bobsleigh #1 winners:  (Justin Kripps, Ben Coakwell, Cameron Stones, Ryan Sommer)
 4-man Bobsleigh #2 winners:  (Justin Kripps, Ryan Sommer, Ben Coakwell, Cameron Stones)
 Skeleton #1 winners:  Geng Wenqiang (m) /  Katie Uhlaender (f)
 Skeleton #2 winners:  Wengang Yan (m) /  Katie Uhlaender (f)
 December 9–11, 2019: NAC #2 in  Park City
 2-man Bobsleigh #1:  (Austin Taylor & Teodor Kostelnik)
 2-woman Bobsleigh #1:  (Kristi Koplin & Jasmine Jones)
 4-man Bobsleigh #1:  (Austin Taylor, Keefer Joyce, Mark Mlakar, Teodor Kostelnik)
 2-man Bobsleigh #2:  (Austin Taylor & Teodor Kostelnik)
 2-woman Bobsleigh #2:  (Kristi Koplin & Jasmine Jones)
 4-man Bobsleigh #2:  (Austin Taylor, Keefer Joyce, Mark Mlakar, Teodor Kostelnik)
 2-man Bobsleigh #3:  (Austin Taylor & Mark Mlakar)
 2-woman Bobsleigh #3:  (Kristi Koplin & Jasmine Jones)
 4-man Bobsleigh #3:  (Austin Taylor, Keefer Joyce, Mark Mlakar, Teodor Kostelnik, Mike Evelyn)
 Skeleton #1 winners:  Nathan Crompton &  Haifeng Zhu (m) /  Yangqi Zhu (f)
 Skeleton #2 winners:  Nathan Crompton (m) /  Yangqi Zhu (f)
 Skeleton #3 winners:  Nathan Crompton (m) /  Yangqi Zhu (f)

2019–20 IBSF Intercontinental Cup
 November 23 & 24, 2019: Intercontinental Cup #1 in  Sochi
 Skeleton #1 winners:  Christopher Grotheer (m) /  Susanne Kreher (f)
 Skeleton #2 winners:  Marcus Wyatt (m) /  Susanne Kreher (f)
 December 7, 2019: Intercontinental Cup #2 in  Winterberg
 Skeleton winners:  Christopher Grotheer (m) /  Susanne Kreher (f)
 December 14 & 15, 2019: Intercontinental Cup #3 in  Schönau am Königsee
 Skeleton #1 winners:  Martin Rosenberger (m) /  Hannah Neise (f)
 Skeleton #2 winners:  Amedeo Bagnis (m) /  Endija Tērauda (f)

2019–20 IBSF Para Bobsleigh World Cup
 December 7 & 8, 2019: PBWC #1 in  Lillehammer
 Para Bobsleigh #1 winner:  Lonnie Bissonnette
 Para Bobsleigh #2 winner:  Corie Mapp
 December 13 & 14, 2019: PBWC #2 in  Oberhof
 Para Bobsleigh #1 winner:  Corie Mapp
 Para Bobsleigh #2 winner:  Corie Mapp
 January 24 & 25: PBWC #3 in  St. Moritz
 February 6 & 7: PBWC #4 in  Lake Placid
 February 15 & 16: PBWC #5 (final) in  Park City

2019–20 IBSF Women's Monobob Events
 November 18, 2019: WME #1 in  Lake Placid #1
 Women's Monobob winner:  Cynthia Appiah
 November 20, 2019: WME #2 in  Lillehammer
 Women's Monobob winner:  Anastasiia Makarova
 December 19, 2019: WME #3 in  Schönau am Königsee
 Women's Monobob winner:  Ying King
 February 15 & 16: WME #4 in  Park City
 March 7 & 8: WME #5 in  La Plagne
 April 3: WME #6 (final) in  Lake Placid #2

Curling

2019–20 International curling championships and Winter Youth Olympics
 October 12 – 19, 2019: 2019 World Mixed Curling Championship in  Aberdeen
  (Skip: Colin Kurz) defeated  (Skip: Andy Kapp), 6–5, to win Canada's second consecutive World Mixed Curling Championship title.
  (Skip: Ingvild Skaga) took third place.
 November 2 – 9, 2019: 2019 Pacific-Asia Curling Championships in  Shenzhen
 Men:  (Skip: Kim Chang-min) defeated  (Skip: Yuta Matsumura), 11–2, to win South Korea's fourth Men's Pacific-Asia Curling Championships title.
  (Skip: Zou Qiang) took third place.
 Women:  (Skip: Han Yu) defeated  (Skip: Seina Nakajima), 10–3, to win China's eighth Women's Pacific-Asia Curling Championships title.
  (Skip: Gim Un-chi) took third place.
 November 16 – 23, 2019: 2019 European Curling Championships in  Helsingborg
 Men:  (Skip: Niklas Edin) defeated  (Skip: Yannick Schwaller), 9–3, to win Sweden's 11th Men's European Curling Championships title.
  (Skip: Ross Paterson) took third place.
 Women:  (Skip: Anna Hasselborg) defeated  (Skip: Eve Muirhead), 5–4, to win Sweden's 21st Women's European Curling Championships title.
  (Skip: Silvana Tirinzoni) took third place.
 November 28 – 30, 2019: 2019 Americas Challenge in  Eveleth
 Men: Champion:  (Skip: Rich Ruohonen); Second:  (Skip: Ramy Cohen Masri); Third:  (Skip: Michael Krahenbuhl)
 Women: Champion:  (Skip: Tabitha Peterson); Second:  (Skip: Adriana Camarena Osorno); Third:  (Skip: Anne Shibuya)
 December 2 – 7, 2019: 2019 World Mixed Doubles Qualification Event in  Howwood
 January 10 – 22: 2020 Winter Youth Olympics in  Lausanne
 Mixed team:  (Skip: Lukas Høstmælingen) defeated  (Skip: Takumi Maeda), 5–4 to win the first Youth Olympic Games Curling Medal.
  (Skip: Valeriia Denisenko) took third place.
 Mixed doubles:  /  defeated  / , 9–5 to win the first Youth Olympic Games Mixed doubles Curling Medal.
  /  took third place.
 January 13 – 18: 2020 World Qualification Event in  Lohja
 ,  both qualified for the 2020 World Men's Curling Championship. ,  both qualified for the 2020 World Women's Curling Championship.
 February 15 – 22: 2020 World Junior Curling Championships in  Krasnoyarsk
 Men:  (Skip: Jacques Gauthier) defeated  (Skip: Marco Hösli), 7–2, to win Canada's 3rd consecutive and 21st overall Men's World Junior Curling Championships title.
  (Skip: James Craik) took third place.
 Women:  (Skip: Mackenzie Zacharias) defeated  (Skip: Kim Min-ji), 7–5, to win Canada's 13th Women's World Junior Curling Championships title.
  (Skip: Vlada Rumiantseva) took third place.
 February 29 – March 7: 2020 World Wheelchair Curling Championship in  Wetzikon
  (Skip: Konstantin Kurokhtin) defeated  (Skip: Mark Ideson), 5–4, to win Russia's 4th World Wheelchair Curling Championship title.
  (Skip: Viljo Petersson-Dahl) took third place.
 March 14 – 22: 2020 World Women's Curling Championship in  Prince George
 Cancelled due to COVID-19 pandemic
 March 28 – April 5: 2020 World Men's Curling Championship in  Glasgow
 April 18 – 25: 2020 World Mixed Doubles & Senior Curling Championships in  Kelowna

2019–20 World Curling Tour and Grand Slam of Curling
 June 15, 2019 – May 3, 2020: 2019–20 World Curling Tour and Grand Slam of Curling Seasons
 October 22 – 27, 2019: 2019 Masters in  North Bay
 Men: Team  Matt Dunstone defeated Team  Brad Gushue, 8–5, to win Saskatchewan's second Men's Masters title.
 Women: Team  Tracy Fleury defeated Team  Sayaka Yoshimura, 7–5, to win Manitoba's second Women's Masters title.
 November 5 – 10, 2019: 2019 Tour Challenge in  Pictou County
 Men: Team  Brad Jacobs defeated Team  Brad Gushue, 6–4, to win Ontario's second consecutive Men's Tour Challenge title.
 Women: Team  Anna Hasselborg defeated Team  Kerri Einarson, 8–5, to win Sweden's first Women's Tour Challenge title.
 December 10 – 15, 2019: 2019 National in  Conception Bay South
 Men: Team  Brad Jacobs defeated  Niklas Edin, 3–1.
 Women: Team  Anna Hasselborg defeated  Jennifer Jones, 7–3.
 January 14 – 19: 2020 Canadian Open in  Yorkton
 Men: Team  Brad Jacobs defeated  John Epping, 6–5.
 Women: Team  Anna Hasselborg defeated  Kim Min-ji, 7–5.
 April 7 – 12: 2020 Players' Championship in  Toronto
 Cancelled due to COVID-19 pandemic
 April 29 – May 3: 2020 Champions Cup in  Olds
 Cancelled due to COVID-19 pandemic

2019–20 Curling Canada Season of Champions events
 November 27 – December 1, 2019: 2019 Canada Cup in  Leduc
 Men:  John Epping defeated  Kevin Koe, 7–4.
 Women:  Rachel Homan defeated  Tracy Fleury, 9–4.
 January 9 – 12: 2020 Continental Cup in  London
 Team World defeated  Team Canada, 37.5–22.5 points, to win their second consecutive and sixth Continental Cup title.
 January 18 – 26: 2020 Canadian Junior Curling Championships in  Langley
 Men:  2 (Skip: Jacques Gauthier) defeated  (Skip: Daniel Bruce), 8–6.
 Women:  (Skip: Mackenzie Zacharias) defeated  (Skip: Abby Marks), 10–3.
 February 15 – 23: 2020 Scotties Tournament of Hearts in  Moose Jaw
  (Skip: Kerri Einarson) defeated  (Skip: Rachel Homan), 8–7 to win Manitoba's record tying 11th Canadian Women's Curling Championship.
  Wild Card (Skip: Jennifer Jones) took third place.
 February 28 – March 8: 2020 Tim Hortons Brier in  Kingston
  (Skip: Brad Gushue) defeated  (Skip: Brendan Bottcher), 7–3 to win Newfoundland and Labrador's 3rd Canadian Men's Curling Championship.
  (Skip: Matt Dunstone) took third place.

Figure skating

Ice hockey

Main world ice hockey championships
 December 26, 2019 – January 2: 2020 IIHF World Women's U18 Championship in  Bratislava
 The  defeated , 2–1 in overtime, to win their eighth World Women's U18 Championship title.
  defeated , 6–1, to win the bronze medal.
  was relegated to Division I – Group A for 2021.
 December 26, 2019 – January 5: 2020 World Junior Ice Hockey Championships in  Ostrava and Třinec
  defeated , 4–3, to win their 18th World Junior Ice Hockey Championship title.
  defeated , 3–2, to win the bronze medal.
  was relegated to Division I – Group A for 2021.
 March 31 – April 10: 2020 IIHF Women's World Championship in  Halifax and Truro
 Note: The Top Division, Division I – Groups A & B, and Division II – Group A tournaments were cancelled due to the coronavirus pandemic.
 April 16 – 26: 2020 IIHF World U18 Championships in  Plymouth and Ann Arbor
 May 8 – 24: 2020 IIHF World Championship in  Zürich and Lausanne

2020 world ice hockey divisions
 December 9, 2019 – May 3: 2020 World Ice Hockey Divisions

2020 IIHF Ice Hockey World Championships

 March 3 – 5: Division IV in  Bishkek
 Note: The Division IV tournament was cancelled due to the coronavirus pandemic.
 April 19 – 25: Division II – Group A in  Zagreb
 April 19 – 25: Division II – Group B in  Reykjavík
 April 19 – 25: Division III – Group A in  Kockelscheuer
 April 20 – 23: Division III – Group B in  Cape Town
 April 27 – May 3: Division I – Group A in  Ljubljana
 April 27 – May 3: Division I – Group B in  Katowice

2020 IIHF World U20 Championship (Junior)

 December 9 – 15, 2019: Division I – Group A in  Minsk
 Final Ranking: 1. , 2. , 3. , 4. , 5. , 6. 
 Austria was promoted to Top Division for 2021.
 Slovenia was relegated to Division I – Group B for 2021.
 December 12 – 18, 2019: Division I – Group B in  Kyiv
 Final Ranking: 1. , 2. , 3. , 4. , 5. , 6. 
 Hungary was promoted to Division I – Group A for 2021.
 Italy was relegated to Division II – Group A for 2021.
 January 6 – 12: Division II – Group A in  Vilnius
 Final Ranking: 1. , 2. , 3. , 4. , 5. , 6. 
 Japan was promoted to Division I – Group B for 2021.
 Serbia was relegated to Division II – Group B for 2021.
 January 13 – 19: Division III in  Sofia
 Final Ranking: 1. , 2. , 3. , 4. , 5. , 6. , 7. , 8. 
 Iceland was promoted to Division II – Group B for 2021.
 January 28 – February 3: Division II – Group B in  Gangneung
 Final Ranking: 1. , 2. , 3. , 4. , 5. , 6. 
 South Korea was promoted to Division II – Group A for 2021.
 Israel was relegated to Division III for 2021.

2020 IIHF World U18 Championship

Note: The Division II – Groups A & B, and Division III – Groups A & B tournaments were cancelled due to the coronavirus pandemic.

 March 16 – 22: Division III – Group A in  Istanbul
 March 22 – 28: Division II – Group A in  Tallinn
 March 23 – 29: Division II – Group B in  Sofia
 March 29 – April 4: Division III – Group B in  Kockelscheuer
 April 12 – 18: Division I – Group B in  Asiago
 April 13 – 19: Division I – Group A in  Spišská Nová Ves

2020 IIHF Women's World Championship

Note: The Top Division, Division I – Groups A & B, and Division II – Group A tournaments were cancelled due to the coronavirus pandemic.

 December 4 – 10, 2019: Division III in  Sofia
 Final Ranking: 1. , 2. , 3. , 4. , 5. , 6. 
 South Africa was promoted to Division II – Group B for 2021.
 February 23 – 29: Division II – Group B in  Akureyri
 Final Ranking: 1. , 2. , 3. , 4. , 5. , 6. 
 Ukraine was relegated to Division III for 2021.
 Note: No promotion to Division II – Group A for 2021 because the 2020 Division II – Group A tournament was cancelled due to the coronavirus pandemic.
 March 28 – April 3: Division I – Group B in  Katowice
 March 29 – April 4: Division II – Group A in  Jaca
 April 12 – 18: Division I – Group A in  Angers

2020 IIHF World Women's U18 Championship

 January 2 – 8: Division I – Group B in  Katowice
 Final Ranking: 1. , 2. , 3. , 4. , 5. , 6. 
 Norway was promoted to Division I – Group A for 2021.
 Great Britain was relegated to Division II – Group A for 2021.
 January 3 – 9: Division I – Group A in  Füssen
 Final Ranking: 1. , 2. , 3. , 4. , 5. , 6. 
 Germany was promoted to Top Division for 2021.
 Denmark was relegated to Division I – Group B for 2021.
 January 25 – 28: Division II – Group A in  Eindhoven
 Final Ranking: 1. , 2. , 3. , 4. 
 Chinese Taipei was promoted to Division I – Group B for 2021.
 Kazakhstan was relegated to Division II – Group B for 2021.
 January 28 – February 2: Division II – Group B in  Mexico City
 Final Ranking: 1. , 2. , 3. , 4. 
 Spain was promoted to Division II – Group A for 2021.

National Hockey League (NHL)
 October 2, 2019 – March 12: 2019–20 NHL season
 Note: The NHL suspended the season due to the coronavirus pandemic.
 October 26, 2019: 2019 Heritage Classic at Mosaic Stadium in  Regina
 The  Winnipeg Jets defeated the  Calgary Flames, with the score of 2–1 in overtime.
 January 1: 2020 Winter Classic at Cotton Bowl in  Dallas
 The  Dallas Stars defeated the  Nashville Predators, with the score of 4–2.
 January 25: 2020 All-Star Game at Enterprise Center in  St. Louis
 Elite Women's 3-on-3 Game: The Canadian All-Stars defeated the American All-Stars, with the score of 2–1.
 All-Star Game: Team Pacific defeated Team Atlantic, with the score of 5–4.
 All-Star Game MVP:  David Pastrňák ( Boston Bruins)
 Accuracy Shooting:  Jaccob Slavin ( Carolina Hurricanes)
 Fastest Skater:  Mathew Barzal ( New York Islanders)
 Hardest Shot:  Shea Weber ( Montreal Canadiens)
 Save Streak:  Jordan Binnington ( St. Louis Blues)
 Shooting Stars:  Patrick Kane ( Chicago Blackhawks)
 February 15: 2020 Stadium Series at Falcon Stadium in  Colorado Springs
 The  Los Angeles Kings defeated the  Colorado Avalanche, with the score of 3–1.
 June 26 – 27: 2020 NHL Entry Draft at Bell Centre in  Montreal

Kontinental Hockey League (KHL)
 September 1, 2019 – February 27: 2019–20 KHL season
 Note: The KHL cancelled the playoffs due to the coronavirus pandemic.

North America (ice hockey)

United States (AHL/ECHL/USHL)
 October 4, 2019 – March 12: 2019–20 AHL season
 Note: The AHL suspended the season due to the coronavirus pandemic.
 October 11, 2019 – March 12: 2019–20 ECHL season
 Note: The ECHL suspended the season due to the coronavirus pandemic.
 TBA: 2019–20 USHL season

Junior (OHL/QMJHL/WHL)
 September 19, 2019 – March 17: 2019–20 QMJHL season
 Note: The QMJHL cancelled the season due to the coronavirus pandemic.
 September 19, 2019 – March 18: 2019–20 OHL season
 Note: The OHL cancelled the season due to the coronavirus pandemic.
 September 20, 2019 – March 18: 2019–20 WHL season
 Note: The WHL cancelled the season due to the coronavirus pandemic.
 May 22 – 31: 2020 Memorial Cup at Prospera Place in  Kelowna
 Note: The Memorial Cup was cancelled due to the coronavirus pandemic.

College (USA–NCAA–Division I)
 March 27 – April 11: 2020 NCAA Division I Men's Ice Hockey Tournament (Frozen Four at Little Caesars Arena in  Detroit)
 TBA: 2020 NCAA National Collegiate Women's Ice Hockey Tournament (Frozen Four at Agganis Arena in  Boston)

College (Canada–U Sports)
 TBA: 2020 U Sports University Cup Tournament at Scotiabank Centre in  Halifax

Women (NWHL)
 October 19, 2019 – March 1: 2019–20 NWHL season
 Note: The NWHL cancelled the Isobel Cup Championship due to the coronavirus pandemic.

Europe (ice hockey)
 August 29, 2019 – February 4: 2019–20 Champions Hockey League
  Frölunda HC defeated  Mountfield HK, 3–1, to win their second consecutive and fourth Champions Hockey League title.
  Djurgårdens IF and  Luleå HF finished in joint third place, as the losing semi-finalists.
 September 20, 2019 – January 12: 2019–20 IIHF Continental Cup
 Final Ranking: 1.  SønderjyskE Ishockey, 2.  Nottingham Panthers, 3.  HC Neman Grodno, 4.  KS Cracovia

Asia (ice hockey)
 August 31, 2019 – February 16: 2019–20 Asia League Ice Hockey season
 Note: The league cancelled the finals due to the coronavirus pandemic.
 December 1 – 8 2019: 2019 Southeast Asian Games in  Pasay, Metro Manila
  ;  ;  
 Thailand defeated Singapore, 8–0, to win their first SEA Games gold medal. Singapore took the silver medal. The Philippines defeated Malaysia, 17–1, to win the bronze medal.
 April 27 – May 1: 2020 IIHF Challenge Cup of Asia in 
 Note: The Women's and Men's U20 tournaments were cancelled due to the coronavirus pandemic.

Luge

2020 Winter Youth Olympics (Luge)
 January 17 – 20: Luge at the 2020 Winter Youth Olympics in  St. Moritz

2019–20 International luge events
 November 21 & 22, 2019: 2019 Junior America-Pacific Luge Championships in  Park City
 Winners:  Sean Hollander (m) /  Sam Judson (f)
 December 13 & 14, 2019: 2019 America-Pacific Luge Championships in  Whistler
 Winners:  Tucker West (m) /  Emily Sweeney (f)
 Doubles winners:  (Justin Snith & Tristan Walker)
 January 18 & 19: 2020 FIL European Luge Championships in  Lillehammer
 January 31 – February 2: FIL Junior World Luge Natural Track Championships 2020 in  Saint Sebastian
 February 1 & 2: 2020 FIL Junior European Luge Championships in  Winterberg
 February 15 & 16: 2020 FIL World Luge Championships in  Sochi
 February 21 & 22: FIL Junior World Luge Championships 2020 in  Oberhof
 February 21 – 23: FIL World Luge Natural Track Championships 2020 in  Moscow

2019–20 Luge World Cup
 November 23 & 24, 2019: LWC #1 in  Innsbruck
 Winners:  Jonas Müller (m) /  Tatiana Ivanova (f)
 Doubles winners:  (Toni Eggert & Sascha Benecken)
 November 30 & December 1, 2019: LWC #2 in  Lake Placid
 Winners:  Jonas Müller (m) /  Julia Taubitz (f)
 Doubles winners:  (Tobias Wendl & Tobias Arlt)
 December 13 & 14, 2019: LWC #3 in  Whistler
 Winners:  Roman Repilov (m) /  Tatiana Ivanova (f)
 Doubles winners:  (Toni Eggert & Sascha Benecken)
 January 11 & 12: LWC #4 in  Altenberg
 January 18 & 19: LWC #5 in  Lillehammer
 January 25 & 26: LWC #6 in  Sigulda
 February 1 & 2: LWC #7 in  Oberhof
 February 29 & March 1: LWC #8 (final) in  Schönau am Königsee

2019–20 Team Relay Luge World Cup
 November 23 & 24, 2019: TRLWC #1 in  Innsbruck
 Team relay winners:  (Andrea Vötter, Dominik Fischnaller, Ivan Nagler & Fabian Malleier)
 January 11 & 12: TRLWC #2 in  Altenberg
 January 18 & 19: TRLWC #3 in  Lillehammer
 February 1 & 2: TRLWC #4 in  Oberhof
 February 22 & 23: TRLWC #5 in  Winterberg
 February 29 & March 1: TRLWC #6 (final) in  Schönau am Königsee

2019–20 Sprint Luge World Cup
 November 30 – December 1, 2019: SLWC #1 in  Lake Placid
 Winners:  Roman Repilov (m) /  Julia Taubitz (f)
 Doubles winners:  (Andris Šics & Juris Šics)
 December 13 & 14, 2019: SLWC #2 in  Whistler
 Winners:  Reinhard Egger (m) /  Tatiana Ivanova (f)
 Doubles winners:  (Toni Eggert & Sascha Benecken)
 January 25 & 26: SLWC #3 (final) in  Sigulda

2019–20 Natural Track Luge World Cup
 January 3 – 5: NTLWC #1 in  Obdach-Winterleiten
 January 9 – 12: NTLWC #2 in  Passeiertal
 January 17 – 19: NTLWC #3 in  Vatra Dornei
 January 24 – 26: NTLWC #4 in  Deutschnofen
 February 7 – 9: NTLWC #5 in  Železniki
 February 13 – 15: NTLWC #6 (final) in  Umhausen

Speed skating
June 18 - In Germany Matthias Grosse is appointed as president of the national German speed skating association,  (DESG) until September 2020. This is seen by media as controversial as partner of drug banned speed skater Claudia Pechstein.

Short track speed skating
June — During a training camp in France, the Dutch Lara van Ruijven hospitalized in intensive care due to an immune system disorder. Her situation became critical and was fighting for her life.

See also
 2020 in skiing
 2020 in sports

References

External links
 Federation of International Bandy
 The International Bobsleigh and Skeleton Federation
 World Curling Federation
 International Skating Union
 International Ice Hockey Federation
 International Luge Federation

Ice sports
Ice sports by year
Ice sports